The Leighton Buzzard Light Railway (LBLR) is a light railway in Leighton Buzzard in Bedfordshire, England. The line was built after the First World War to serve sand quarries north of the town. In the late 1960s the quarries switched to road transport and the railway was taken over by volunteers, who now run the line as a heritage railway.

History

Sand extraction 

A bed of Lower Cretaceous sand across Bedfordshire has been quarried on a small scale for centuries. The most significant occur around Leighton Buzzard. In the 19th century sand was carried by horse carts from quarries south of the town to be shipped on the Dunstable-Leighton Buzzard railway. The carts damaged roads and resulted in claims for compensation against the quarry owners from Bedfordshire County Council. At the end of the century steam wagons were introduced which increased the damage to roads.

The outbreak of the First World War cut off supplies of foundry sand from Belgium. Sand was needed for ammunition factories and new sources were sought. Leighton Buzzard sands proved well suited and production increased. After 1919 the quarry companies were told they could no longer transport sand by roads, so a private industrial railway was proposed to take the traffic.

The original railway 

Leighton Buzzard Light Railway opened on Thursday 20 November 1919, linking the sand quarries (Double Arches at the far end of the line) with the mainline railway south of the town at Grovebury sidings. The line was built using surplus equipment from the War Department Light Railways. The line opened using steam traction by two Hudswell Clarke 0-6-0 side tank steam locomotives. These proved inappropriate for the tightly-curved line and the steam locomotives were sold in 1921. From that point the railway was run using internal combustion, almost exclusively the products of the Motor Rail company. It was one of the first railways in Britain entirely operated by internal combustion.

After the Second World War sand traffic returned to the roads. In 1953 a strike on mainline railways pushed more traffic onto the roads. By the mid-1960s only one sand quarry, Arnold's, still used the light railway. The BR line to Dunstable was closed in 1965, apart from a short stretch from Leighton Buzzard to Grovebury interchange sidings, which survived until 1969.

The preservation era 

In 1968 the line was more lightly used and volunteers under the name of "The Iron Horse Railway Preservation Society" took over the line on weekends to run the first formal passenger services on the line.  Part of the agreement between the railway and the volunteers was that volunteers would repair the permanent way.  This was undertaken, the group having purchased secondhand rolling stock and four Simplex diesels from the St Albans Sand and Gravel company, which were dismantled and formed into one machine.  The last sand train ran on the main line in 1969, although several quarries continued to use the lines within their quarries. These were eventually replaced by roads and conveyor belts and the last internal quarry line was abandoned in 1981. Today the line is run purely as a heritage railway.

A large collection of steam and internal combustion locomotives run on the line.  Visitors can ride the train and are issued with an Edmondson ticket.  There is a collection of industrial railway locomotives at Stonehenge Works towards the northern end of the line.

The railway is promoted by the Campaign to Protect Rural England.

The route 

The line is unusual as it runs mostly through modern housing built since the 1970s, although the last half mile runs through countryside. There are open level crossings for which trains stop.

The railway began at Grovebury Sidings, where sand trains unloaded into washers and the sand was shipped to standard-gauge trains on the Dunstable branch or to road. The sidings and industrial plant at Grovebury were replaced with an industrial estate in the early 1970s.

Trains from Grovebury crossed Billington Road by a level crossing and worked up a steep grade to Page's Park.   Here a branch line south connected to the line's main engineering workshop and the Pratt's Pit quarry. In 2006 Page's Park forms the southern terminus of the heritage railway.

From Page's Park the line curves north towards a summit at Red Barn. From there it descends at 1 in 60 (1.7%) before climbing again to cross Stanbridge Road. On the left is the site of Marley's Tile Works, now a housing estate, which was connected to the railway for most of its existence. The line descends Marley's Bank at a maximum of 1 in 25 (4%). Loaded sand trains to Grovebury Sidings often needed a banking locomotive.

At the bottom of Marley's Bank the line turns sharply north and runs along the level to Leedon Loop. The line here passes through housing. After Leedon, the railway crosses Hockliffe Road and crosses the Clipstone Brook and begins to climb again on a 1 in 50 (2%) gradient to cross Vandyke Road.

Immediately after crossing Vandyke Road the line curves 90 degrees to Vandyke Junction where there was a passing loop. Here the branch line from Chamberlain's Barn and New Trees quarries joined the main line. A short section of this branch remains intact although heritage trains do not use it. The railway then runs parallel to Vandyke Road, climbing steadily to Bryan's Loop then descending again to cross the Shenley Hill Road. The line levels and continues to Stonehenge Works now the engineering workshop of the preserved railway. This is also the northern terminus of modern operations.

Preserved locomotives

These are the locomotives on the preserved railway. All are  gauge nominally, except where noted.

Steam locomotives

Internal combustion locomotives

Electric Locomotives

Previous resident locomotives

Visiting locomotives

Notable visitors
On 22 June 2013, John Travolta visited the railway with his son Benjamin.

See also
British narrow-gauge railways

References

External links

 Leighton Buzzard Narrow Gauge Railway website
 https://web.archive.org/web/20160110092408/http://www.gertrude1578.co.uk/
 http://www.railworld.net

Heritage railways in Bedfordshire
2 ft gauge railways in England
Industrial railways in England
Leighton Buzzard